Sanam Chauhdry is a Pakistani former actress. She is known for her drama serial Aasmanon Pay Likha (2013). She was nominated at the 3rd Hum Awards in the Best Soap Actress category for her role in Bhool.

She retired from acting in August 2021.

Filmography

Television

Films

References

Living people
Actresses from Karachi
Pakistani television actresses
21st-century Pakistani actresses
1991 births
Pakistani emigrants to the United States